William Arthur Lindsay (1866-1936) was a British politician and Irish Unionist. He was the Member of Parliament for Belfast South between 1917 until 1918 when the seat was abolished. He then served as MP for Belfast Cromac between 1918 and 1922, until the seat was abolished. He was the only MP to ever represent that constituency. He was a member of the Irish Unionist Party.

References

External links 
 
 

1866 births
1936 deaths
Members of the Parliament of the United Kingdom for Belfast constituencies (1801–1922)
UK MPs 1910–1918
Irish Unionist Party MPs
UK MPs 1918–1922